Bellevue College (BC) is a public college in Bellevue, Washington, United States. It is the largest of the 34 institutions that make up the Washington Community and Technical Colleges system and the third-largest institution of higher education overall in the state (behind the University of Washington and Washington State University).

The institution offers transfer associate degree programs that cover the first two years of a college education, bachelor's degree programs, professional-technical degrees and certificates, a large continuing education program, and pre-college programs. The college also has a variety of distance education and online learning options.

BC's service district includes the public school districts of Bellevue, Mercer Island, Issaquah, Skykomish and Snoqualmie Valley. The current President of Bellevue College is former Governor of Washington and US Secretary Commerce Gary Locke.

History

Bellevue College was established in 1966, originally under the auspices of the Bellevue School District, as an institution of higher education for residents of the Eastside of Lake Washington. The college opened with 464 students and 37 instructors, with a curriculum that included classes in the social sciences, trigonometry, physics, botany, and English, among others. Vocational classes initially offered included nursing, basic aircraft blueprint reading, and foodservice management. Dr. Merle E. Landerholm was appointed the college's first president.

The college graduated its first class in June 1967, with 10 students earning degrees and certificates, and 15 earning high school diplomas.

Also in 1967, the Washington State Legislature passed the Community College Act, which created a statewide community college system and separated Bellevue Community College from the Bellevue School District.

In December 1969, Bellevue Community College was dedicated, and in 1970, the institution received accreditation for the first time from the Northwest Association of Secondary and Higher Schools (now the Northwest Commission on Colleges and Universities).

By the early seventies, the college had grown to encompass nine instructional divisions: Allied Health; Business; Creative Arts; Home and Community Education; Humanities; Individual Development; Physical Development and Performance; Science; and Social Science.

The number of students grew steadily through the '80s and '90s as the campus grew, and peaked during the 2000–01 academic year with 39,300 students.

In 2009, the college officially changed its name from Bellevue Community College to Bellevue College, to reflect the fact that it now offered four-year bachelor's degrees in addition to its traditional offerings of two-year associate degrees and certificates.

, more than 460,000 people had taken a class at Bellevue College, and 58,515 students had earned 50,562 degrees, certificates, and other awards since its founding in 1966.

In February 2020, the college unveiled "Never Again Is Now", a mural by artist Erin Shigaki that depicts two Japanese American children who were sent to internment camps during World War II. The mural's caption included a reference to Bellevue businessman Miller Freeman, a prominent anti-Japanese activist, which was removed by vice president of institutional advancement Gayle Colston Barge. The change in caption sparked outcry from students and the Asian American community, resulting in Barge being placed on administrative leave. Barge and Bellevue College president Jerry Weber, who defended her actions, announced their resignations on March 2.

Former Washington governor Gary Locke was named the college's interim president on May 28, 2020. Locke was the 21st governor of Washington state and later served in the Obama Administration as U.S. Secretary of Commerce, and as the 10th Ambassador to China.

Facilities

Main Campus 

The college initially operated in portable classrooms on the campus of Newport High School. In December 1967, ground was broken for the first of three phases of construction of a new campus, on land purchased a few years earlier by the Bellevue School District. In 1969, construction was completed, and BC began the fall quarter on its new campus, with 2,200 full-time students. Phase two of construction, completed in 1973, doubled the size of the campus and included a 300-seat theater (the largest public theater in Bellevue at the time), 2,500-seat gymnasium and sports complex, planetarium (the first in the Puget Sound region), daycare center and greenhouse. The third construction phase was finished in 1974 and added 24,000 square feet of space, along with a running track and other facilities.

Nearly 20 years later, the first building added to campus since the initial construction boom in the seventies was completed, with a new student services building in 1993. From 1998 to 2001, three new buildings (N, L and R) opened on campus.

In 2009, the Science (S) building was completed. In 2015, the Health Technology (T) building was completed. In 2018 the college opened its first residence housing. The Student Success Center opened in 2020.

Bellevue College now has 18 buildings, including 12 academic buildings and one parking garage, with more than 813,309 square feet of space. Of that, 742,784 square feet is a dedicated classroom/instructional space.

The 100-acre (400,000 m2) campus includes a planetarium, gymnasium, fitness center, art gallery, library, cafeteria, coffee shops, theater, and a variety of common areas.

North Campus 

In 2011, BC's Continuing Education division moved from a former Microsoft building it had occupied since 2001 into 62,000 square foot building on a two-acre property along the Highway 520 corridor in north Bellevue.

East Campus 

BC purchased 20 acres (81,000 m2) of land in 2010 in the Issaquah Highlands development in the city of Issaquah, Washington which currently remains undeveloped.

Academics
Bellevue College's instructional programs are structured into five major divisions: Arts and Humanities; Health Sciences, Education and Wellness Institute; Institute for Business and Information Technology; Science; and Social Science.

Expansion of four-year degree programs
In 2005, the Washington State Legislature authorized a limited pilot program that allowed community and technical colleges, which historically have granted only certificates and two-year associate degrees, to offer four-year bachelor's degrees. The major impetus for this legislation were studies concluding that Washington state needed to produce more graduates with bachelor's degrees to meet the needs of the growing economy, both now and in the future.

Proponents of the pilot program cited several reasons: many community college students are place-bound and cannot move elsewhere to attend a university; many of the state's residents live in areas without access to universities; particular programs may not be offered at nearby universities; increased competition for fewer slots at universities were shutting out many students, and some career-oriented bachelor programs were not offered anywhere in the state.

Bellevue College was one of four schools – along with South Seattle Community College, Peninsula College and Olympic College – chosen to participate in the pilot program. The bachelor's degrees were to be "applied" in nature, meaning they would be directed at people already working in specialized fields and who want to advance their careers. In order to participate, colleges had to demonstrate the following: sufficient student and employer demand; similar degrees were not offered elsewhere; the college had the expertise to offer the degree, and an independent accrediting agency had to approve the degree.

In 2007, Bellevue College began enrolling students in its first four-year program, a Bachelor of Applied Science in Radiation and Imaging Sciences, currently, the only degree of its kind offered in the state.

In 2009, BC proposed legislation that would have allowed it to award a range of Bachelor of Arts or Science degrees, creating a hybrid community-college model, but the measure failed to pass in committee in the legislature. Yet public comment and community response to the college's request for expanded four-year programs has been overwhelmingly positive. Despite this setback, BC announced the addition of its second four-year program that year, a Bachelor of Applied Arts in Interior Design. Also in 2009, BC changed its name, from Bellevue Community College to Bellevue College, to reflect the evolving nature of the institution, which now offered bachelor's degrees in addition to associate degrees and certificates.

In 2010, the legislature made permanent the pilot program allowing the state's community and technical colleges to offer bachelor's degrees, and any community or technical college could now develop a four-year degree program. That same year, the Northwest Commission on Colleges and Universities accredited Bellevue College as a baccalaureate degree-granting institution.

Partnership with Eastern Washington University 
In 2005, Eastern Washington University partnered with Bellevue College to offer a limited number of bachelor's degrees on campus. EWU established a university center in a leased building on BC's campus. The degrees are structured in a 2 + 2 format, meaning that a student takes the first two years of classes through BC, and then completes a bachelor's degree by taking junior and senior-level classes under the auspices of EWU, but on BC's campus. EWU bachelor's degrees currently offered on BC's campus include Business Administration, Early Childhood Education, Applied Technology, Psychology, and Interdisciplinary Studies.

Transfer degrees 
Many Bellevue College students earn their college freshman and sophomore credits (and receive an associate degree), and then transfer with junior status to participating four-year colleges and universities to continue their education. Specific transfer degrees are offered in Arts & Sciences, Business, Elementary Education, Math Education, Music, and Science. In the 2009–10 academic year, Bellevue College produced nearly 10 percent of all transfer students to public four-year institutions in Washington, more than any other community or technical college in the state.

Non-transfer degrees 
Bellevue College offers an Associate in Arts General Studies that grants academic recognition for the completion of 90 applicable college-level credits and is not designed for students intending to transfer to a university/college in pursuit of a bachelor's degree.

Another non-transfer program awards an Associate in Occupational and Life Skills, the only one of its kind in the United States. The course of study helps adults with certain developmental disabilities become independent by developing their interpersonal and career skills so they can become responsible, self-determined citizens.

Professional-technical programs 
BC offers Professional-Technical programs in 99 different fields, with 23 awarding associate degrees and 76 awarding certificates. These programs prepare students for specific careers. Its highest enrolled programs are: Business and Accounting; Information Technology; Interior Design; Nursing; and Radiation and Imaging Sciences.

Continuing Education 
The Continuing Education division, the largest among the state's community and technical colleges, is housed in Bellevue College's North Campus, a 70,000-square-foot (6,500 m2) building in north Bellevue, along the Washington State Route 520 corridor. The division offers classes (and awards non-credit certificates) in computing and technology, business and workplace skills, music, and personal enrichment, and specializes in developing and delivering customized onsite training programs for workers at various companies throughout the region.

Other programs 
Bellevue College also offers Adult Basic Education, GED preparation, English for non-native speakers, worker retraining, courses to improve reading, writing, grammar and math skills, and programs geared for high school students, including Running Start.

Accreditation
Bellevue College is accredited by the Northwest Commission on Colleges and Universities (NWCCU), initially in 1970 as an associate degree-granting institution, and in 2010 as a four-year baccalaureate degree-granting institution.
Additionally, the following programs are accredited individually (year denotes first accreditation):
 Interior Design (2006) – Council for Interior Design Accreditation
 Nuclear Medicine Technology (1990) – Joint Review Committee on Educational Programs in Nuclear Medicine Technology
 Medical Dosimetry (2010) – Joint Review Committee on Education in Radiologic Technology
 Radiation Therapy (1985) – Joint Review Committee on Education in Radiologic Technology
 Diagnostic Ultrasound (1982) – Commission on Accreditation of Allied Health Education Programs
 Neurodiagnostic Technology (2012) – Committee on Accreditation for Education in Neurodiagnostic Technology
 Nursing (1970) – National League for Nursing Accrediting Commission
 Digital Marketing (2017) - Joint Review Committee on Educational Programs in Digital Marketing.

Student life
Bellevue College has more than 80 student clubs and programs, including Athletics, Music Activities, Black Student Union, El Centro Latino, BC Association of Veterans, Muslim Student Association, Jewish Student Union, First Nation Student Association, Asian Student Association, Phi Theta Kappa honor society, and DECA.

The Associated Student Government (ASG), whose members are elected by popular student vote each year, allocates money to clubs and programs. Funds come from the Services and Activities Fee (S&A) that all tuition-paying students pay each quarter. The fee is subject to the approval (via campus vote) of the student body and is meant to enrich the lives of students on campus.

The Watchdog (formerly The Jibsheet) is the weekly English-language student-run newspaper.

Campus media
Bellevue College operates an FM radio station, KBCS, from its campus as a public service to the community. It is the only non-commercial community radio station in King County and can be heard at 91.3 FM in Bellevue, Seattle, and other communities in King County and northern Pierce County. The station began broadcasting on Monday, February 5, 1973, as a 10-watt, student-run station and has grown over the years to comprise a full-time staff and a large roster of community volunteers. It is primarily listener-supported, with two-thirds of its budget coming from listener donations; the balance comes from the Corporation for Public Broadcasting and sponsorships from local businesses and organizations. The station's programming consists of a mix of news and music, with musical genres including jazz, hip hop, soul, bluegrass, rock, gospel and an assortment of world music. The station moved its broadcast tower/antennae from its campus to a place near the summit of Cougar Mountain near Issaquah. This move dramatically increased the strength of the station's signal, improving reception in areas that currently receive it, and pushing the signal into areas that previously could not pick it up, including Tacoma and other parts of Pierce County.

Also as a public service, Bellevue College broadcasts select classes, lectures, games involving BC athletic teams, and other programming via its television station, called the College Channel, which can be viewed on Comcast cable channel 28 in certain communities on the Eastside of King County, including Bellevue.

The Watchdog is the student newspaper for Bellevue College. It has been published weekly since 1967 and covers local news, college issues, and campus life and events The newspaper receives its funding from the Bellevue College Services and Activities committee in addition to print and digital advertisements.

Athletics
BC's athletic teams compete in the Northwest Athletic Conference, also known as the NWAC, in the following sports: baseball, softball, volleyball, men's and women's basketball, men's and women's soccer, men's and women's golf, and women's tennis.

Campus athletic facilities include a 1,000-seat baseball field (Courter Field), a soccer field, and the Courter Family Athletic Pavilion, which contains a 2,500-seat gymnasium. Notable former athletes include Major League Baseball all-star pitcher Evan Meek, who currently plays for the Lancaster Barnstormers, pitcher Blake Hawksworth, formerly of the Los Angeles Dodgers, Bobby McAllister 2-time ACC Soccer All Star, 9 year professional and co-founder of Sozo Sports of Central Washington and actor Jim Caviezel, who played basketball at BC.

References

External links
 Official website
 The Watchdog (student newspaper)

 
Two-year colleges in the United States
Universities and colleges in Bellevue, Washington
Educational institutions established in 1966
Universities and colleges accredited by the Northwest Commission on Colleges and Universities
Seattle metropolitan area
1966 establishments in Washington (state)
Community colleges in Washington (state)